Holymoorside and Walton is a civil parish in the North East Derbyshire district of Derbyshire, England.  The parish contains 18 listed buildings that are recorded in the National Heritage List for England.   All the listed buildings are designated at Grade II, the lowest of the three grades, which is applied to "buildings of national importance and special interest".  The parish contains the villages of Holymoorside and Walton, and the surrounding countryside.  Most of the listed buildings are houses and associated structures, farmhouses and farm buildings, and the others are a milepost and a war memorial.


Buildings

References

Citations

Sources

 

Lists of listed buildings in Derbyshire